Ureibacillus suwonensis is a bacterium from the genus of Ureibacillus which has been isolated from cotton waste compost from Suwon in Korea.

References

Bacillales
Bacteria described in 2006